Chilgapsan is a mountain of Chungcheongnam-do, western South Korea. It has an elevation of 561 metres.

See also
List of mountains of Korea

References

Mountains of South Chungcheong Province
Cheongyang County
Mountains of South Korea